Karpinsky Glacier or Karpinsky Ice Cap (Lednik Karpinskogo), also known as Mount Karpinsky, is a large ice cap on October Revolution Island, Severnaya Zemlya, Russian Federation.

It was named after Aleksandr Petrovich Karpinsky, a Russian geologist.

Geography
This ice cap has a surface of 2,800 km² and is the largest of the seven ice caps on October Revolution Island. Its maximum height is 963 m and it is also the highest point in Severnaya Zemlya. 

The Karpinsky Ice Cap is located on the eastern side of the island with the Laptev Sea and the Shokalsky Strait on its eastern side. To the north it feeds the Matusevich Fjord, the largest fjord in the archipelago —beyond which lies the Rusanov Glacier, and to the southeast it feeds the head of the smaller Marat Fjord.

To the south of the Karpinsky Glacier lies the University Glacier, which reaches a height of 806 m.

See also
 List of glaciers in Russia
 Lake Fiordovoye

References

Glaciers of Severnaya Zemlya
Karpinsky
Bodies of water of Krasnoyarsk Krai
Ice caps of Russia